M124 or M-124 may refer to:
 M-124 (Michigan highway)
 a mutation defining the human haplogroup R2 (Y-DNA)
 M124 (Cape Town), a Metropolitan Route in Cape Town, South Africa